KORR-A (born May 24, 1992) is a performer, artist, model, singer, rapper and movie producer.

Biography
KORR-A (born as Kristina Korban) was born in Kyiv. Born near the disaster stricken ruins of Chernobyl, KORR-A was brought to the United States at the age of three to inquire about health complications she suffered as a result of the plant explosion. It was as a child in the U.S. where she began to fall in love with 90's hip-hop and pop hits and the dance moves of icons like Michael and Janet Jackson. She relocated back to Ukraine to reunite with her parents again at the age of 11 where she began dance and singing lessons. Finally, she returned to the U.S. to attend Pepperdine University and launching her music career.

Career 
KORR-A reemerged on the music scene in 2013 with her  "Fiyacraka." Crafted by Grammy-nominated producer, Dave Audé—who has scored over 83 #1 Billboard Dance/Club Play Chart— "Fiyacraka" reached #18 on the Billboard Dance Club Charts, #12 on UK's Music Week Commercial Pop Charts, and #7 on the DJ Times National Dance/Crossover Charts.

In 2015 KORR-A aligned with Tearce "Kizzo," who has worked his sonic magic with everyone from Afrojack and Inna to Jason Derulo, Pitbull (rapper) and Ne-Yo. They delivered "Swipe Right" —a whimsical spin on the Tinder (app)/Grinder apps and the modern dating world.

She followed up "Swipe Right" with another Kizzo collabo as he helped her add a provocative touch to "C&C Music Factory's 1990 #1 hit "Gonna Make You Sweat (Everybody Dance Now)" on her hit "Everybody Get Down." The visuals garnered more than half a million views on YouTube and her next single continued to solidified her road to success. "Touch Me Like You Mean It" – which she debuted at the Fusion Radio 10th Anniversary event in Chicago—marked more chart success. The track peaked at No. 20 on the Billboard Dance/Club Play Chart.

In Summer 2016 she released her new single "Cali Love" as a result of collaboration with Overdrive Production

In 2017 KORR-A released her first EP "Trapped" which showed us a more vulnerable side of the artist.

EP 
- Trapped (2017)

Singles

Trapped 
"Cali Love"
"Everybody Get Down"
"Heart Of Glass*"
"Touch Me Like You Mean It" 
"Swipe Right"
"Fiyacraka"

Music videos
 "Trapped
 "Cali Love"
 "Everybody Get Down"
 "Heart Of Glass*"
 "Touch Me Like You Mean It"
 "Swipe Right"
 "Fiyacraka"

References 

21st-century American singers
Ukrainian emigrants to the United States
Hip hop singers
1992 births
Living people
Musicians from Kyiv
Women hip hop musicians
21st-century American women singers